Marcelo Emanuel Argüello (born 19 January 1993) is an Argentine professional footballer who plays as a centre-forward for Deportivo Merlo.

Career
Argüello started his career with Colón, after a stint with Sebastián Gaboto. He made four appearances during the 2012–13 season, which included his Primera División bow against San Martín on 10 August 2012 and his Copa Sudamericana debut on 23 August versus Racing Club. In July 2014, Argüello was loaned to Gimnasia y Esgrima of San Salvador de Jujuy. Eleven matches followed across the 2014 and 2015 seasons in Primera B Nacional. A loan move to Deportivo Quito was completed in January 2016. He scored two goals, against Portoviejo's Colón FC and Imbabura, in five games.

2016 saw Argüello leave parent club Colón to join Concepción del Uruguay's Gimnasia y Esgrima. The forward netted four times in the 2016–17 Torneo Federal A, including two against Defensores de Pronunciamiento as they finished sixth. In mid-2017, Argüello switched Argentina for Bolivia by agreeing a contract with Universitario de Sucre. He scored on his starting debut versus Real Potosí on 13 August, on the way to a total of six goals throughout the third part of 2016–17. Argüello remained for one further campaign in Bolivia's top-flight, appearing eleven more times whilst scoring five goals.

Argüello returned to Argentina with Olimpo of Primera B Nacional on 15 July 2018, remaining for one season before heading to Sportivo Belgrano. In February 2020, Argüello terminated his contract in order to join a Peruvian team - later revealed to be Santos of the Segunda División. He scored on debut against Cultural Santa Rosa on 27 October, which preceded further goals against Deportivo Coopsol, Alianza Atlético, Unión Huaral and Chavelines Juniors as they placed second bottom of a ten-team division. In January 2021, Argüello made a return to the Bolivian Primera División with Real Santa Cruz.

After leaving Real Santa Cruz in July 2021, Argüello returned to his former club Universitario de Sucre, who was now playing in the Copa Simón Bolívar. Argüello helped the club with promotion to the Bolivian Primera División again for the 2022 season. In January 2022, he moved back to his homeland, and signed for Gimnasia Jujuy, before joining a news club again in June 2022; Deportivo Merlo.

Career statistics
.

References

External links

1993 births
Living people
People from San Jerónimo Department
Argentine footballers
Argentine expatriate footballers
Association football forwards
Sportspeople from Santa Fe Province
Argentine Primera División players
Primera Nacional players
Ecuadorian Serie B players
Torneo Federal A players
Bolivian Primera División players
Peruvian Segunda División players
Club Atlético Colón footballers
Gimnasia y Esgrima de Jujuy footballers
S.D. Quito footballers
Gimnasia y Esgrima de Concepción del Uruguay footballers
Universitario de Sucre footballers
Olimpo footballers
Sportivo Belgrano footballers
Santos de Nasca players
Real Santa Cruz players
Deportivo Merlo footballers
Expatriate footballers in Ecuador
Expatriate footballers in Bolivia
Expatriate footballers in Peru
Argentine expatriate sportspeople in Ecuador
Argentine expatriate sportspeople in Bolivia
Argentine expatriate sportspeople in Peru